USS Peacock was a sloop-of-war in the United States Navy during the War of 1812.

Peacock was authorized by an act of Congress 3 March 1813, laid down 9 July 1813, by Adam and Noah Brown at the New York Navy Yard, and launched on 19 September 1813. Peacock served in the War of 1812, capturing twenty ships. Subsequently, the ship served in the Mediterranean Squadron, and in the "Mosquito Fleet," which fought to suppress Caribbean piracy. She patrolled the South American coast during the colonial wars of independence.

Peacock was decommissioned in 1827 and broken up in 1828 to be rebuilt as USS Peacock, intended as an exploration ship. She sailed as part of the United States Exploring Expedition in 1838. Peacock ran aground and broke apart on the Columbia Bar without loss of life in 1841.

War of 1812
During the War of 1812, Peacock made three cruises under the command of Master Commandant Lewis Warrington. Departing New York 12 March 1814, she sailed with supplies to the naval station at St. Mary's, Georgia. Off Cape Canaveral, Florida 29 April, she captured the British brig  and sent her to Savannah, Georgia. The United States Navy took her into service as USS Epervier.

Peacock departed from Savannah on 4 June on her second cruise. Proceeding to the Grand Banks and along the coasts of Ireland and Spain, Peacock returned via the West Indies to New York. She captured 14 enemy vessels of various sizes during this journey. On 14 August, Peacock captured William, Whiteway, master, of Bristol, and scuttled her.

In the Sunda Straight of Indonesia, Peacock captured three merchant vessels, Union, of Calcutta, Hall, master, Boon, master, and Brio del Mar, of Batavia, on 13, 21 and 29 June, respectively. Peacock took the goods stored in the Venus''' cargo holds (which contained specie, opium, and bale goods), and threw them overboard. Peacock also took Union's cargo (which consisted of gold dust and pepper). Peacock burnt Union and Brio del Mar, and put their crews on Venus, which she made a cartel to carry the crews to Batavia. Venus arrived there about 11 July.

Because the captures occurred after the end of the war, the Phoenix and Star insurance companies of Calcutta applied to the U.S. government for compensation. Congress voted full compensation, £12,000 for Union and £3,000 for Breo de Mar.

Last action of the War of 1812

On 30 June Peacock captured the 16-gun brig , which was under the command of Lieutenant Charles Boyce of the Bombay Marine of the British East India Company in the Straits of Sunda, in the final naval action of the war. Boyce informed Warrington that the war had ended. Warrington suspected a ruse and ordered Boyce to surrender. When Boyce refused, Warrington opened fire, killing one seaman, two European invalids, and three lascars, wounding Boyce severely, as well as mortally wounding the first lieutenant, and also wounding five lascars. American casualties amounted to some four or five men wounded. When Boyce provided documents proving that the Treaty of Ghent ending the war had been ratified, Warrington released his victims, though at no point did he in any way inquire about Boyce's condition or that of any of the injured aboard Nautilus. Peacock returned to New York on the 30th of October. A court of inquiry in Boston a year later exonerated Warrington of all blame. In his report on the incident, Warrington reported that the British casualties had only been lascars.

Post-warPeacock left New York on 13 June 1816, bound for France, with the Honorable Albert Gallatin and party aboard. After pulling into Havre de Grâce July second, she proceeded to join the Mediterranean Squadron. But for a year of Mediterranean–United States—and return transits, 15 November 1818 – 17 November 1819, the sloop remained with this squadron until 8 May 1821, when she departed for home; she then went into ordinary at the Washington Navy Yard 10 July.

Fighting pirates and disease
Pirates were attacking West Indies shipping in the 1820's, and on 3 June 1822, Peacock became the flagship of Commodore David Porter's West India Squadron, in charge of rooting out pirates. Peacock served in the expedition that included the U.S. Revenue Marine schooner  and the British schooner . The trio broke up a pirate establishment at Bahia Honda Key , 28–30 September, capturing four vessels. They burnt two and prize crews took the other two to New Orleans. Eighteen of the captured pirate crew members were sent to New Orleans for trial.Record of Movements, p 77 Peacock captured the schooner Pilot on 10 April 1823 and another sloop 16 April.

In September 1822, "malignant fever (assumed Yellow Fever)" necessitated a recess from activities, and Peacock pulled into Norfolk, Virginia on 28 November 1822. Similarly yellow fever decimated the frigate , which lost 74 members of its crew to the disease, before finally returning to Norfolk. The symptoms per Dr. Travett, included, bleeding in the mouth, nose, eyes, and the gastrointestinal tract which caused vomit containing blood, hence the Spanish name for Yellow Fever, vómito negro ("black vomit"). Captain Stephen Cassin writing to Secretary of the Navy, Smith Thompson, on 31 October 1822 confirmed the outbreak and stated, the crew suffered the "black vomit." 

South Pacific coast and Hawaiʻi
In July 1823, the sloop was involved in the Battle of Lake Maracaibo and Mr. Peter Storms decided to join the Independentist cause, who won their independence on 3 August. Later, in March 1824, the sloop proceeded to the Pacific and for some months cruised along the west coast of South America, where the colonies were struggling for independence. In September 1825, Peacock under the command of Commodore Thomas ap Catesby Jones, sailed to the Kingdom of Hawaiʻi, where a treaty of friendship, commerce and navigation was negotiated.The Hawai'i-United States Treaty of 1826 From 24 July 1826 until 6 January 1827, the sloop visited other Pacific islands to protect American commerce and the whaling industry. Returning to South America from Hawaii, the ship was struck by a whale, suffering serious damage. Nevertheless, she reached Callao, from which she departed 25 June for New York.

USS Peacock (1828)Peacock returned to New York in October 1827 to be decommissioned, broken up and rebuilt in 1828 for a planned expedition of exploration. Her size and configuration stayed about the same, but her guns were reduced to ten: eight long 24-pounders (10.89 kg) and two long 9-pounders (4.08 kg). When plans for the exploratory voyage stalled in Congress, she re-entered regular service in the West Indies from 1829 to 1831. Following refit, both Peacock and the newly commissioned Boxer, a 10-gun schooner, were ordered to assist the frigate Potomac, which had just sailed on the first Sumatran Expedition. The two ships were also charged with diplomatic missions. Boxer left Boston Harbor about the middle of February 1832, with orders to proceed to Liberia and from thence to join Peacock off the coast of Brazil; Peacock sailed on 8 March 1832 under Commander David Geisinger.

Diplomatic missionsPeacock conveyed Mr. Francis Baylies and family to the United Provinces of the River Plate (Argentina) to assume the post of United States chargé d'affaires in the wake of the USS Lexington raid on the Falkland Islands in 1831. On arrival both British line-of-battle ship Plantagenet and H. B. M. frigate Druid complimented her flag by playing Hail, Columbia. Also aboard was 
President Andrew Jackson's "special confidential agent" Edmund Roberts in the official status of Captain's clerk.

25June 1832, having left orders for Boxer to follow to Bencoolen, Peacock departed war-stricken Montevideo for the Cape of Good Hope. After taking water at Tristan da Cunha and rounding the cape, then trying to keep about latitude 38° or 39°, on 9 or 10 August a sea of uncommon height and volume struck the ship, and threw her nearly on her beam ends, completely overwhelmed the gig in the starboard-quarter, crushed it into atoms in a moment, and buried the first three ratlines of the mizen-shrouds under water.

Under orders to gather information before going to Cochin-China, Peacock sailed for Manila by way of Long Island and 'Crokatoa' (Krakatoa), where hot springs found on the eastern side of the islands one hundred and fifty feet from the shore boiled furiously up, through many fathoms of water. Her chronometers proving useless, Peacock threaded the Sunda Strait by dead reckoning. Diarrhea and dysentery prevailed among the crew from Angier to Manila; after a fortnight there, cholera struck despite the overall cleanliness of the ship. Peacock lost seven crewmen, and many who did recover died later in the voyage of other diseases. No new case of cholera occurred after 2 November 1833 while Peacock was under way for Macao. Within two leagues of the Lemma or Ladrone islands, she took aboard a pilot after settling on a fee of thirteen dollars and a bottle of rum.

After six weeks in the vicinity of Canton City, China, with the onset of the winter northeast monsoon and no sign of Boxer, Peacock sailed from Lintin Island in the Pearl River estuary for the bay of Turane (modern Danang) as best for access to Hué, capital of Cochin-China  her task was to explore the possibilities of expanding trade with the kingdom. Contrary winds from the northwest rather than the expected northeast quarter, coupled with a strong southward current, caused her to lose ground on every tack until, on 6 January 1833, she entered what enquiries disclosed to be the Vung-lam harbor of Phu Yen province.

On 20 March 1833 Roberts concluded the Siamese-American Treaty of Amity and Commerce with the minister representing King Rama III, and Peacock departed on 5 April to call on Singapore, where she stayed between 1 and 11 May.

On 29 August in the Red Sea, while bound to Mocha, Peacock encountered Nautilus, the same brig Peacock had attacked after the end of the War of 1812 with Great Britain. Nautilus was sailing to Surat as escort to four brigs crowded with pilgrims returning from Mecca. This time Peacock did not attack Nautilus.

Arriving 13 September off Muscat, Roberts concluded a treaty with Sultan Said bin Sultan, and departed on 7 October 1833. On the voyage from Muscat to Mozambique, Roberts omitted the particulars of each day, but stated that what he had written served "to show the absolute necessity of having first-rate chronometers, or the lunar observations carefully attended to; and never omitted to be taken when practicable."Peacock returned Roberts to Rio de Janeiro on 17 January 1834, where on 1 March 1834 he boarded Lexington to return to Boston.

Return mission
On 23 April 1835, Peacock, under the command of C. K. Stribling, and accompanied by U.S. Schooner Enterprise, Lieutenant Commanding A. S. Campbell, departed New York Harbor. Roberts was once again aboard Peacock, and the two vessels were under the command of Commodore Edmund P. Kennedy. The mission first sailed to Brazil, then round the Cape of Good Hope to Zanzibar, for Roberts to return ratifications of the two treaties.

 Masirah incident 
Roberts and six men under the command of Passed Midshipman William Rogers left in a small boat to effect a rescue. The crew hove overboard 11 of 22 guns, re-floated the ship on the 23 September, and repelled Arab marauders before making sail the next day. On 28 September, Peacock was off Muscat when she encountered the sloop-of-war Sultan under the Muscat flag, and under the command of Mr. Taylor. Said bin Sultan later recovered the guns that had been thrown overboard and shipped them to Roberts free of charge. Peacock later obtained this letter:I certify that during the period I have navigated the Arabian coast, and been employed in the trigonometrical survey of the same, now executing by order of the Bombay government, that I have ever found it necessary to be careful to take nocturnal as well as diurnal observations, as frequent as possible, owing to the rapidity and fickleness of the currents, which, in some parts, I have found running at the rate of three and four knots an hour, and I have known the Palinurus set between forty and fifty miles dead in shore, in a dead calm, during the night. 
It is owing to such currents, that I conceive the United States ship of war Peacock run aground, as have many British ships in previous years, on and near the same spot; when at the changes of the monsoons, and sometimes at the full and change, you have such thick weather, as to prevent the necessary observations being taken with accuracy and the navigator standing on with confidence as to his position, and with no land in sight, finds himself to his sorrow, often wrong, owing to a deceitful and imperceptible current, which has set him with rapidity upon it. The position of Mazeira Island, is laid down by Owen many miles too much to the westward.

Given under my hand this 10th day of November, 1835.

S. B. Haines. 
Commander of the 
Honorable East India Company's 
surveying brig 
To sailing master, John Weems, U. S. Navy.

A second attempt at negotiation with Cochin-China failed as Roberts fell desperately ill of dysentery; he withdrew to Macao where he died 12 June 1836. William Ruschenberger, M.D., (1807–1895) was commissioned on this voyage, and gave an account of it up until 27 October 1837 when Peacock anchored opposite the city of Norfolk, Virginia, after an absence of more than two and a half years.

Exploration expedition and fatePeacock'' joined the United States Exploring Expedition in 1838 until getting stuck on a bar of the Columbia River in Oregon. She broke up on 17–19 July 1841 after all the crew and much of the scientific data had been taken off, though Titian Peale lost most of his notes.

See also
List of historical schooners
List of sloops of war of the United States Navy
Bibliography of early American naval history

Notes, citations and references

Notes

Citations

References
 
  
 
 
 
 
 
 
 
 

Sloops of the United States Navy
Barbary Wars American ships
War of 1812 ships of the United States
Ships built in Brooklyn
1813 ships
1828 ships
Ships of the United States Exploring Expedition
Anti-piracy battles involving the United States